Clark High School was a public secondary school located in Whiting, Indiana. Clark served students in grades 6–12 in the School City of Hammond. Following the 2020–2021 school year, the school closed due to the consolidation of Hammond schools.

Demographics
The demographic breakdown of the 1,342 students enrolled for 2017-18 was:
Male - 51.6%
Female - 48.4%
Native American/Alaskan - 0.1%
Asian - 0.2%
Black - 11.6%
Hispanic - 72.0%
Native Hawaiian/Pacific islander - 0.1%
White - 14.2%
Multiracial - 1.8%

82.6% of the students were eligible for free or reduced-cost lunch. For 2017–18, Clark was a Title I school.

Athletics
The Hammond Clark Pioneers compete in the Great Lakes Athletic Conference. School colors are royal blue and white. As of 2019–20, the following Indiana High School Athletic Association (IHSAA) sanctioned sports were offered:

Baseball (boys) 
Basketball (girls and boys) 
Cross country (girls and boys) 
Football (boys)
Soccer (girls and boys) 
Softball (girls) 
Swimming and diving (girls and boys) 
Tennis (girls) 
Track and field (girls and boys) 
Volleyball (girls) 
Wrestling (boys) 
State champion - 1938

See also
 List of high schools in Indiana

References

External links

School City of Hammond

Public high schools in Indiana
Schools in Lake County, Indiana
Hammond, Indiana
2021 disestablishments in Indiana